Rosemar Maria Coelho Neto (born January 2, 1977 in Miracatu, São Paulo)  is a track and field sprint athlete who competes internationally for Brazil.

Coelho Neto represented Brazil at the 2008 Summer Olympics in Beijing. She competed at the 4 × 100 metres relay together with Lucimar de Moura, Thaissa Presti and Rosângela Santos. In their first round heat they placed third behind Belgium and Great Britain, but in front of Nigeria. Their time of 43.38 seconds was the fifth time overall out of sixteen participating nations. With this result they qualified for the final in which they sprinted to a time of 43.14 seconds and the fourth place behind Nigeria, missing out on the bronze medal with 0.10 seconds. However, in 2016, the IOC stripped Russia of its Gold Medal due to doping, meaning Rosângela and her teammates inherited the bronze medal.

Competition record

1Did not finish in the semifinals

References
 

1977 births
Living people
Brazilian female sprinters
Olympic athletes of Brazil
Athletes (track and field) at the 2004 Summer Olympics
Athletes (track and field) at the 2008 Summer Olympics
Universiade medalists in athletics (track and field)
Sportspeople from São Paulo (state)
Olympic bronze medalists for Brazil
Medalists at the 2008 Summer Olympics
Olympic bronze medalists in athletics (track and field)
Universiade silver medalists for Brazil
Universiade bronze medalists for Brazil
Medalists at the 2001 Summer Universiade
Medalists at the 2003 Summer Universiade
Olympic female sprinters
21st-century Brazilian women